Juventus is the name of several football clubs in Europe, Latin America, Africa and Australia:

Football
 Juventus F.C., association football club based in Turin, Italy. It can also refer to:
Juventus F.C. (women), women's association football team of Juventus F.C.
Juventus Next Gen, men's reserve team of Juventus F.C.
Juventus F.C. Youth Sector, youth system of Juventus F.C.
Alma Juventus Fano 1906, an Italian football club from Fano, Marche
A.S.D. Fortis Juventus 1909, an Italian football club from Borgo San Lorenzo, Tuscany
Juventus Audax Roma, an Italian defunct football club from Rome
Juventus Foot-Ball Club, an Italian defunct football club from Florenfe
Juventus Italia F.C., an Italian defunct football club from Milan
Juventus F.C. (Belize), a Belizean football club from Orange Walk Town
Juventus F.C. (Nicaragua), a Nicaraguan football club from Managua
SV Juventus, a Bonaire football club from Kralendijk
Clube Atlético Juventus, a Brazilian football club from São Paulo
Atlético Clube Juventus, a Brazilian football club from Rio Branco, Acre state
Grêmio Esportivo Juventus, a Brazilian football club from Jaraguá do Sul, Santa Catarina state
Clube Atlético Juventus (SC), a Brazilian football club from Seara, Santa Catarina state
Juventus Atlético Clube, a Brazilian football club from Santa Rosa, Rio Grande do Sul state
Juventus Esporte Clube, a Brazilian football club from Macapá, Amapá state
Juventus Esporte Clube (Guariba) - a Brazilian football club from Guariba, São Paulo state
Juventus Futebol Clube, a Brazilian football club from Rio de Janeiro
Sociedade Educação Física Juventus - a Brazilian defunct football club from Curitiba
Associação Atlética Juventus Minasnovense, a Brazilian football club from Minas Novas, Minas Gerais state
Club Deportivo Juventus, a Chilean football club from Caldera, Atacama Region
Juventus (Costa Rica), a Costa Rican football club
Club Social y Deportivo Juventus, an Ecuadorian football club from Esmeraldas, Ecuador
FC Juventus Löhne 2005, a German football club from Löhne, North Rhine-Westphalia
ASG Juventus de Sainte-Anne, a Guadeloupean football club from Sainte-Anne
FC Juventus des Cayes, a Haitian football club from  Les Cayes
Juventus de Yopougon, an Ivorian football club from Yopougon, Lagunes
Juventus Corazón, a Peruvian football club from Arequipa
CFT Juventus Focșani, a Romanian football club from Focșani, Vrancea County
CS Juventus Bascov, a Romanian football club from Bascov, Argeș County
CS Juventus Fălticeni, a Romanian football club from Fălticeni, Suceava County
FC Juventus Bistrița, a Romanian football club from Bistrița, Bistriţa-Năsăud County
CS Juventus București, a Romanian football club from Bucharest founded in 1992
Juventus de Saint-Martin, a Saint-Martin football club
Sasolburg Juventus FC, a South African football club from Tshwane
Juventus Idrottsförening, a Swedish football club from Västerås
FC Juventus Cresciano, a Swiss football club from Cresciano, Ticino
FC Juventus Dulliken, a Swiss football club from Dulliken, Solothurn
FC Juventus St. Gallen, a Swiss football club from St. Gallen
SC Young Fellows Juventus, a Swiss football club from Zürich

previously known as Juventus
A.S. Livorno Calcio, an Italian football club from Livorno, Tuscany founded by merger between SPES Livorn and Virtus Juventusque
FBC Luino 1910, an Italian football club from Luino, Lombardy previously known as Juventus FC
S.S.D. Massese, an Italian football club from Massa, Tuscany previously known as US Massese Juventus 1919
A.S. Trapani, an Italian football club from Trapani, Sicily previously known as Juventus Trapani
Adelaide City F.C. 1946, an Australian football club previously known as Adelaide Juventus
Brunswick Juventus (now known as Brunswick Zebras S.C.), an Australian football (soccer) club from Brunswick (Melbourne)
Hobart Zebras FC, an Australian football (soccer) club from Hobart, Tasmania previously known as Juventus S.C. Hobart
Launceston City FC, an Australian football (soccer) club from Launceston, Tasmania previously known as Launceston Juventus S.C.
FK Juventus Malchika, a Bulgarian defunct football club from Malchika, Levski Municipality merged with FK Levski to OFC Levski 2007
FC Petrolul Ploiești, a Romanian football club from Ploiești, Prahova County founded as FC Juventus București in 1924
MFK Topvar Topoľčany, a Slovak football club from Topoľčany, Nitra Region previously known as ASC Juventus Topoľčany
AC Bellinzona, a Swiss football club from Bellinzona, Ticino previously known as FC Juventus Bellinzona
FC Juventus Locarno, a Swiss defunct football club from Locarno, Ticino merged with FC Unitas Locarno to form FC Locarno
Deportivo Táchira FC, a Venezuelan football club from San Cristóbal, Táchira founded as Juventus de San Cristobal

Other
Juventas (or Juventus), goddess of youth
Juventud Guerrera, a Mexican professional wrestler
Juventus (basketball club), a basketball club from Utena, Lithuania, playing in the LKL
Juventus, a youth movement in the mythical country of Evallonia in John Buchan's novel, The House of the Four Winds

See also
Juve (disambiguation)
Juventud (disambiguation)
Juventude (disambiguation)
Juventus F.C. (disambiguation)
J'ouvert, the Caribbean festival.